Call to Power II is a PC turn-based strategy game released by Activision as a sequel to Civilization: Call to Power, which itself was named after the Civilization series by Sid Meier; this game could not have "Civilization" in its title because the license to the Civilization name was lost.

In October 2003, Activision released the source code, enabling the Apolyton gaming community to debug, improve, and add new features. After being unavailable for a long time, the game was re-released in the digital distribution on GOG.com in 2010.

Gameplay
Call to Power II had a number of differences from the previous Call to Power. Chiefly, the first game was criticized for its user interface, which prompted a redesign for the sequel.

Call to Power II also included several gameplay differences. Maximum army size was increased, some balance adjustments were made to avoid the balance problems from the original Call to Power, and the economic system in Call to Power II was reworked so that controlling good terrain became more profitable. Another difference is that the player can receive bonuses for certain achievements, if they are the first to perform the action (recapturing a city, sailing around the world, etc.).

The diplomacy model in Call to Power II was improved, with more agreements available for negotiation. Players could, for example, ask the AI controlled civilizations to stop researching some technology, or to reduce their nuclear weapons arsenal.

Space colonization and the space layer were removed from Call to Power II, along with the "Alien Life Project" victory condition. This was replaced by a new victory condition which requires the player to cover most of the planet's territory with Gaia sensors and build the Gaia controller wonder, winning the game.

Community support

Mods
One significant feature of Call to Power II is its support for mods. A large number of game rules are stored in text files, along with many AI scripts. Even more importantly, Call to Power II had a fully documented scripting language called SLIC, with a C-like syntax, through which many things about the game could be tweaked. The game came with 3 mods (Classical/Medieval, original Default and Samurai/Mythical Creatures). The sole released patch for Call to Power II enhanced the functionality of SLIC, allowing creation of mods that change the gameplay significantly. The game's community created many mods, with the primary goals of fixing the AI and balance issues that were in the original game. Later, new game play features were incorporated through mods as well.

Source code release
After Activision ceased to support Call to Power II, the Apolyton Civilization Site became the de facto support center for the game, being the only active online community of this game and offering help with technical problems. That site is also largely where the modding efforts occurred.

At one point, the members of the Apolyton site contacted Activision and asked them to release the source code to Call to Power II. After several months of negotiation, Activision agreed and the source code was released in October 2003 exclusively to the Apolyton Civilization Site to allow the community to support the game themselves with community patches. There were limitations to how the source code might be used; for example, no commercial use of anything created with the source base was allowed.

Currently, the source code project is accessible through a Subversion server. Through Apolyton, those wishing to view the source code or wish to modify the code can find the SVN server forum at the Apolyton link below for more information.

The community produced several patches over the years, the last version being rev.1111 from June 2011. However, as of September 2, 2013, the unofficial patches are not meant to be used with the later GOG.com release of the game, without further tweaking.

Critical reception
John Lee reviewed the PC version of the game for Next Generation, rating it three stars out of five, and stated that "Yogi Berra said it best: 'It's like deja vu all over again."

Call to Power II received mixed reviews. GameSpot awarded 7.2 out of 10, highlighting the improved interface, animations and sound, and the game's replay value. Criticisms included the lack of feedback during diplomacy, lack of tactical control during combat, the shift from city micromanagement to army micromanagement, and weak AI.

References

External links
 

2000 video games
4X video games
Activision games
Civilization (series)
Commercial video games with freely available source code
Video game sequels
Video games with isometric graphics
Windows games
Windows-only games
Video games developed in the United States